This list of Korean drinks includes drinks, traditional or modern, which are distinctive to or closely identified with Korea. Brands and companies are South Korean unless noted.

Alcoholic drinks

Baekseju
Beolddeokju, herbal rice wine believed to increase male stamina; bottles are often sold topped with a ceramic penis
Cheongju, rice wine
Sogokju
Beopju, a traditional liquor of Gyeongju
Dugyeonju
Gyepiju
Insamju, medicinal wine; made from ginseng
Makgeolli wine from rice and fermentation starter nuruk
Munbaeju
Persimmon wine, produced in the wine tunnel south of Daegu
Soju, sweet potato or rice liquor
Jinro, a brand of soju
Yakju
Takju, also known as makgeolli
Dongdongju

Beers

Hite, other products include Black Beer Stout
Oriental Brewery, brands include OB and Cass
Taedonggang, a North Korean beer resembling ale; produced since 2002

Non-alcoholic drinks

Traditional
All Korean traditional non-alcoholic drinks are referred to as "eumcheongnyu" (음청류 ). According to historical documents regarding Korean cuisine, almost 200 items of eumcheongnyu are found. Eumcheongnyu can be divided into the categories of cha (차 tea), tang (탕 boiled water), jang (장 fermented grain juice with sour taste), suksu (숙수), galsu (갈수 thirst water), hwachae (화채 fruit punch), sikhye (식혜 sweet rice drink), sujeonggwa (수정과 persimmon drink), milsu or kkulmul (밀수, 꿀물 honeyed water), jeup (즙 juice) and milk by their ingredient materials and preparation methods. Among the eumcheongnyu, cha, hwachae, sikhye, and sujeonggwa are still widely favored and consumed; however, tang, jang, suksu, and galsu have almost disappeared in the present.

Teas
A more extensive list can be found in: Korean tea, See also:  Korean tea ceremony

Boricha, made from barley
Green tea (녹차 [nokcha]), a staple of tea culture across East Asia
Oksusu cha, made from boiled roasted corn kernels
Sungnyung made from boiled toasted rice
Yulmu cha, made from the yulmu (Coix lacryma-jobi var. ma-yuen) grains

Hwachae

 Hwachae is a group of Korean traditional drinks made with fruits, flower petals, and honey, or sugar.

Others
Ogamcha, a drink with alder, licorice, chaga and ginseng
Shikhye, a malt drink
Solhinun, a pine bud drink made by Lotte
Sujeonggwa, a persimmon and cinnamon drink

Modern
2% fruit flavored water; peach, lemon, apple, grape and pomegranate 
815 Cola (discontinued and relaunched in 2014)
Achimhaetsal, rice milk
Bacchus-F
Banana Flavored Milk
Chilsung Cider, a clear carbonated sugar soda (not lemon-lime like Sprite)
Duyu, soymilk
McCOL, a barley-made cola
Milkis, a creamy soda
Sac Sac, a Mandarin orange-flavored drink (not pure juice) with bits of pulp, found in small aluminum cans with a peel-off tab
Vita 500, an energy drink launched in 2001

See also
 Korean cuisine
 List of Korean dishes
 List of North Korean dishes

References

External links

Korean wines

Korean drinks
Drinks
Drinks